James Robert Duggar (born July 18, 1965) is an American real estate agent, politician, and television personality, known for the reality series 19 Kids and Counting, which aired from 2008 to 2015. From 1999 to 2003, he was a Republican member of the Arkansas House of Representatives.

Early life
Duggar was born in Springdale, now the fourth largest city in Arkansas, the son of James Lee "Jimmy Lee" Duggar (1936–2009) and the former Mary Lester (1941–2019), who owned a real estate brokerage agency. Duggar has an older sister, Deanna (b. 1962). He graduated from Shiloh Christian School.

Career
Duggar is a licensed realtor and owns several commercial properties in his local area as an investor.

Political career
From 1999 to 2003, Duggar served in the Arkansas House of Representatives for District 6, which was located in northern Washington County. He first won election in 1998, defeating Kathy McFetridge with 56% of the vote. He was re-elected by a wider margin in 2000. Duggar was vice chair of the House Corrections and Criminal Law Subcommittee and also participated in the committees on Insurance and Commerce and Judiciary.

In 2002, rather than seeking reelection to the state House, Duggar ran unsuccessfully in the Republican primary election for the United States Senate. He was defeated by the incumbent Senator Tim Hutchinson by a lopsided vote of 71,576 to 20,546. In 2006, Duggar unsuccessfully sought the Republican nomination for the District 35 seat in the Arkansas State Senate. He lost to his opponent, Bill Pritchard, by two hundred votes.

In 2021, Duggar announced his second candidacy for the State Senate, now running in the 7th District. The election was triggered after the incumbent Republican, Lance Eads, resigned. Duggar finished third out of four candidates in the Republican primary, with 15.3% of the vote.

Marriage and children
On July 21, 1984, Duggar married Michelle Annette Ruark. Together, the couple has 19 children: Joshua ("Josh") (b. 1988), twins Jana and John-David (b. 1990), Jill (b. 1991), Jessa (b. 1992), Jinger (b. 1993), Joseph (b. 1995), Josiah (b. 1996), Joy-Anna (b. 1997), twins Jedidiah and Jeremiah (b. 1998), Jason (b. 2000), James (b. 2001), Justin (b. 2002), Jackson (b. 2004), Johannah (b. 2005), Jennifer (b. 2007), Jordyn (b. 2008), and Josie (b. 2009). Duggar and his wife also have permanent guardianship of his wife's great-nephew Tyler Hutchins (b. 2008), since November 2016. The family was featured on the reality series 19 Kids and Counting from 2008 to 2015.

Duggar and his family are Independent Baptist Christians. They are members of the Institute in Basic Life Principles organization (aka IBLP and Advanced Training Institute), a homeschooling program run by Christian minister Bill Gothard. Duggar's oldest daughter, Jana Duggar, is a leader at the IBLP's "Journey to the Heart" youth ministry.

Josh Duggar molestation report
In 2006, Jim Bob Duggar told the Arkansas State Police that his oldest son, Josh, had molested five underage girls, including family members, in the early 2000s when he was 14–15 years old. The alleged abuse involved touching their breast and genital regions on multiple occasions while they slept and in a few cases while they were awake. Jim Bob Duggar had been prompted to speak to police after producers of The Oprah Winfrey Show told authorities they had received allegations against Josh Duggar. Jim Bob Duggar told police he had referred his son to a program consisting of physical labor and counseling after consulting with the leadership of his church. Michelle Duggar stated their son was sent away from home to work for a family friend in the home remodeling business. Upon the son's return home, the father took him to Arkansas State Trooper Jim Hutchens, a family acquaintance, who reportedly gave him a "stern talk". The three-year statute of limitations had expired when the allegations were reported, and Josh Duggar was not formally charged with any crime.

The public did not learn about this until 2015, when Josh Duggar's public admission of his behavior caused TLC to cancel the reality show 19 Kids and Counting. In a joint statement to People magazine following the public revelation, Jim Bob and Michelle Duggar said: "Even though we would never choose to go through something so terrible, each one of our family members drew closer to God. We pray that as people watch our lives they see that we are not a perfect family. We have challenges and struggles every day."

TLC rebooted the Duggar's reality show as Counting On later in 2015, focusing on the older Duggar children and their spouses and children. This show, too, was canceled in 2021 after Josh Duggar was arrested. On December 9, 2021, Josh Duggar was convicted of receiving and possessing child pornography.

Books
Duggar and his wife have written two books together, both published by Howard Books. The first is titled The Duggars: 20 and Counting!, which was released on December 2, 2008. Their second is A Love That Multiplies, which was released June 7, 2011.

Other political activities
In 2008, Duggar and his wife endorsed former Governor Mike Huckabee in his campaign for the Republican presidential primaries. In January 2012, the Duggars endorsed Republican former U.S. Senator Rick Santorum of Pennsylvania for president.

Electoral history

See also
 The Bates Family

References

External links
 Duggar family website
 
 Arkansas House of Representatives page (archived from November 2002)

1965 births
Living people
American investors
American real estate brokers
American television writers
American male television writers
Baptists from Arkansas
Businesspeople from Arkansas
Duggar family
Republican Party members of the Arkansas House of Representatives
Participants in American reality television series
People from Springdale, Arkansas
Writers from Arkansas
People from Washington County, Arkansas
Screenwriters from Arkansas
Conservatism in the United States
20th-century American politicians
21st-century American politicians